The 850th HEC ("Renegades") Company resides in Cambridge, Minn. The unit's primary mission is to provide command and control of engineer platoon effects that are necessary to conduct missions such as repair, maintain, construct air/ground lines of communication (LOC); emplace culverts; hauling; force protection; and limited clearing operations.

History
The unit's history starts with being the 257th Military Police Company, based out of Cottage Grove, Minn., which deployed in 1990/1991 in support of Operation Desert Shield/Desert Storm. In 1995, the unit reorganized into Battery F, 151st Field Artillery, deploying soldiers to Europe and Southwest Asia in support of Operation Enduring Freedom and Operation Iraqi Freedom. In 2006, the unit reorganized once more to what is now the 850th Horizontal Engineer Company, part of the 682nd Engineer Battalion. In 2013 the unit deployed to Afghanistan. During this deployment soldiers built roads and culverts for locals and built observation points for security forces among other missions.

Insignia

Organization

Order of battle

Equipment

Training sites

Weapons

Vehicles

References

External links
 Official website

Companies of the United States Army National Guard
Engineering units and formations of the United States Army
Engineer companies
Military units and formations established in 1967